William Donald Regan (December 11, 1908 — February 16, 1995) was a Canadian professional ice hockey player who played 67 games in the National Hockey League with the New York Rangers and New York Americans between 1930 and 1933. The rest of his career, which lasted from 1929 to 1934, was spent in the minor leagues. He was born in Creighton Mine, Ontario.

Playing career
Regan began his professional career in 1929, playing for the Boston Tigers, although later that season he was traded to the New York Rangers. He subsequently played for the Bronx Tigers, the Springfield Indians and the New Haven Eagles before being traded to the New York Americans. He ended his career (1934) playing for the Cleveland Indians, though briefly played senior hockey during the 1936–37 season.

Career statistics

Regular season and playoffs

References

1908 births
1995 deaths
Boston Tigers (CAHL) players
Bronx Tigers players
Canadian ice hockey defencemen
Cleveland Indians (IHL) players
Ice hockey people from Ontario
New Haven Eagles players
New York Americans players
New York Rangers players
Sportspeople from Greater Sudbury
Springfield Indians players
Toronto St. Michael's Majors players